Singapore participated in the 2007 Southeast Asian Games (SEA) which were held in the city of Nakhon Ratchasima, Thailand from 6 to 16 December 2007.

Singapore won a record 43 gold medals at the SEA Games.

Participation details

Singapore sent a total contingent of 658 to the 2007 SEA Games: of 442 competitors and 216 officials. The largest contingent ever sent to an away games, they participated in 35 of the 45 sports in the games.

No athletes were fielded for Baseball, Boxing, Chess, Handball, Netball, Tennis, Traditional boat race, Volleyball, Weightlifting and Wrestling.

Medals
Singapore entered the games expecting a Gold medal hail of between 35 and 45. On 12 December 2007, the target was raised and 42 - 45.

Significant results
Singapore retained pole position in Swimming, despite the absence of Joscelin Yeo who has since retired. 10 of the 22 swimmers were first-timers. In all, they broke four games records, nine national records, four U17 national records, and recorded 26 personal bests.
The Table tennis contingent swept all seven gold medals in the sport, the first time Singapore had done so in the SEA games.
The water polo team retained their title for the 22nd consecutive time since 1965, despite having eight new members in a team of 13.

References

External links
Team Singapore 2007 Southeast Asian Games

2007
Southeast Asian Games
Nations at the 2007 Southeast Asian Games